En Den Dino is an Israeli counting rhyme. It was featured on an episode of Sesame Street.
It's an Israeli version of the Eeny, meeny, miny, moe counting method.

A variant of the song is also popular in Serbia, Bosnia and Herzegovina, Montenegro and Croatia. The lyrics in this version are as follows: "En ten tini, sava raka tini, sava raka tika taka, bija baja bum, trif traf truf.".

According to some accounts, the counting rhyme's lyrics are of Sanskrit origin.

See also 
 Nursery rhyme
 Akka bakka bonka rakka
 Eeny, meeny, miny, moe
 Entten tentten teelikamentten
 Ip dip

References

External links 
En Den Dino on Youtube

Israeli songs
Hebrew-language children's songs
Hebrew-language songs